The Batangas Province Science High School (Mataas na Paaralang Pang-Agham ng Lalawigan ng Batangas) is a public residential science high school system in Dacanlao, Calaca, Batangas, Philippines that focuses on the intensive study of science, mathematics and technology. It is a DepEd-recognized science high school that was founded by Batangas Provincial Governor Hon. Hermilando I. Mandanas. It opened its doors to aspiring students in June 1998; in that same year, the school's first English student publication, The Quillmaker, was published.

The BPSHS System offers scholarships to Batangueño students who are gifted in the sciences and mathematics. Though BPSHS is a public school, enrollment is limited, and applicants undergo a highly competitive review process before admission. Admission to the BPSHS is by competitive examination only, and only Filipino citizens who live in Batangas Province (excluding the cities of Lipa, Tanauan and Batangas) are eligible to take the entrance exams and be admitted if their scores are above the cut-off.

History
The Batangas Province Science High School is a complete science high school in Dacanlao, Calaca, Batangas. Its creation is the brainchild of the former Batangas Governor Hermilando I. Mandanas. It came to realization when the governor assumed office in 1995. The province was looking for a strategic partner and suitable place to achieve the noble dream of putting up the first public science high school in the province.

Coinciding with the desire of the governor was Supt. Oscar S. Manalo's desire to open up the subject school for the best and brightest elementary graduates from 31 towns of the province who are inclined to sciences with high expectations to be future Batangueño scientists.

Sometime in 1995, NPC's Batangas Coal-Fired Thermal Power Plant was seeking new ways of restoring its relationship with the community in line with the corporation's revitalized Social Responsibility Enhancement Program. Studies revealed that the resident's negative perception for the power plant is mainly due to their lack of knowledge concerning its operation. Among the strategies contemplated to counter this was the promotion of science and technology among high school students. The NPC established the Calaca Science Centrum to disseminate informnation to the community, particularly the students. The features offered by the centrum laboratory, the library, the computers, the science gallery and the multi-purpose auditorium are very much needed by the students in the proposed school. With this, Gov. Mandanas proposed the idea that NPC could be the strategic partner of the Provincial Government in the setting up of the Provincial High School.

The facilities of Science Centrum could very well answer for the high school's requirements. Having common objectives, NPC-BCFTPP, the Provincial Government, the Department of Education, Culture and Sports (precursor of Department of Educqtion), aligned with each other for the establishment of the Batangas Province Science (BPSHS) in 1997. Pending the completion of the school building, the Calaca Science Centrum temporarily hosted the BPSHS for nearly three years and Dacanlao National High School served as the student dormitory. Cristina A. Perez, principal of Dacanlao Gregorio Agoncillo National High School was appointed officer-in-charge of the science school in the first years of its operation while Ermelinda M. Matienzo, division science supervisor, was tasked to supervise and monitor the school. Meantime, the province would double-time to construct a school building for BPSHS near the power plant. The present site was selected mainly because of its proximity to Calaca Science Centrum.

Likewise, the late Dacanlao Barangay Captain, Hon. Magtanggol M. Luistro and his councilmen approved the request of the governor and superintendent to use the 1,561 sq.m. lot, served as gratuitous conveyance to the school.

Seventeen students pioneered the school during the opening in school year 1998–1999. It was July 2001 when Supt. Portia Gesilva issued a Division Memorandum to Ermelinda M. Matienzo, Education Supervisor I – Secondary Science, Minda S. Castillo, Education Supervisor I – Elementary Science, Alfredo S. Magpile, District Supervisor – Calaca, and Sally Malabanan, the school officer-in-charge for their joint efforts to prepare documents for government recognition and accreditation of the school. The full accreditation was granted on April 2, 2002, when DepEd Secretary Raul S. Roco signed the request for science high school establishment. Dr. Librada C. Landicho, teacher-in-charge, made the series of follow-ups to the DepEd Central Office until the school was recognized and accredited.

Other schools heads who assumed office were Pedro A. Adarlo (October 18, 2004 – October 20, 2006), Elma V. Manalo (October 21, 2006 – October 8, 2008), Miguel B. Ularte (October 8, 2008 – February 8, 2011), Simeona Rechie C. Ojales (February 8, 2011– 2016) and Clarissa B. Peniz (2016–present).

Presently, the total enrollment is 140 and the teaching force is composed of eleven teachers, six of them are in the national item roll while five are borrowed from nearby schools. Batangas Province Science High School is under a fiscal autonomy program. There is one head teacher, one guidance counselor, three clerks, one utility worker, and one dormitory attendant.

Funding
Since its inception, BPSHS has been fully funded by the government, meaning no student is required to pay any tuition, room, board, or other student fees (not exactly). This funding is supplemented by the Government of Batangas' Provincial School Board funding, which supports BPSHS' academic, residential, and outreach programs as well as providing funds for capital improvements.

Admission
Who may apply for admission to BPSHS:
Grade VI pupils belonging the upper 20% of the graduating class.
No grade lower than 85% in Science, Math and English.
General average not lower than 85%.
Physically fit.
Students with special aptitudes in Science and Mathematics.
Recommended by their school principal.

Requirements:
Original copy of Form 138-E (Report Card)
Certificate of Residency duly signed by Barangay captain 
Certificate of Good Moral Character from principal
Original copy of Birth Certificate
Medical Certificate from the public/private physician

Performance
The performance of the school shows that from SY 1998–2018, it was always the top school in the division level contests/competitions, belonged to the top five schools in the regional level contests/competitions, and was one of the top schools in the national level.

From SY 2007–2010, the school was always the top school in the Division and Regional Achievement Test results and belongs to the top 20 schools in the national level. Furthermore, in SY 2010–2011, BPSHS ranked 1st in the National Achievement Test - Mathematics Competencies. BPSHS was commended last 2010 as one of the top performing schools in the Philippines. Mr. Michael Ularte, former school head, received the award in Bohol.

BPSHS is noted for its prominence when it comes to science quiz bees, Metrobank - MTAP DepEd Challenge, Press Conferences and the like. Last SY 2010–2011, the seniors of BPSHS grabbed the second place in the Regional Level for the Metrobank - MTAP DepEd Challenge. In relation with this, a junior represented the Division of Batangas in the same competition. The school had four Division Champions (thus making them regional qualifiers) and another 1 Regional Qualifier for the same school year's inter-school press conference. There were two division champions for the Science Quiz Bee in SY 2009–2010. The aforementioned Division Science Quiz Bee champions copped the 3rd and 4th place in the Regional Level, as well.

In SY 2014–2015, the school sent participants to the Regional Schools Press Conference and won 3rd place in Collaborative Publishing English.

Graduates
Since 1998, approximately 40% of the graduates are admitted at University of the Philippines, and the remaining are enrolled to other top universities like University of Santo Tomas, Batangas State University, Polytechnic University of the Philippines, Ateneo de Manila University, Far Eastern University, and De La Salle University. A number of the students, who choose to pursue pure and applied sciences degrees, successfully apply for college scholarships from the Department of Science and Technology.

References

Science high schools in the Philippines
High schools in Batangas